Arhopala paraganesa felipa is a butterfly of the family Lycaenidae first described by Gerardo Lamas in 2008. It is a subspecies of Arhopala paraganesa. It is found on Palawan Island in the Philippines. It is rare. Forewing length is 13-14.5 mm (male); 13-14 mm (female).

References
Schroeder, Heinz G. & Treadaway, Colin G. (2002). "Zur Kenntnis philippinischer Lycaenidae, 15 (Lepidoptera)". Nachrichten des Entomologischen Vereins Apollo. N.F. 22 (4): 239-242.
Lamas, Gerardo (2008). Zootaxa. 1848: 47-56.

Arhopala
Butterflies described in 2002
Butterflies of Asia
Butterfly subspecies